Centracanthus cirrus, also known as the curled picarel, is a species of picarel native to the eastern Atlantic Ocean and the Mediterranean Sea. This species grows to a length of  TL though usually not exceeding . This species is of minor importance to local commercial fisheries. This species is the only known member of its genus.

References

Sparidae
Monotypic fish genera
Fish described in 1810
Taxa named by Constantine Samuel Rafinesque